Daniyal Sultan or Daniyal Bek (1809, İlisu — 1871, Istanbul) was an ethnic Tsakhur nobleman, general-major of the Imperial Russian Army and in Ottoman Army and the last ruler of Elisu Sultanate. He is best known to be one of the naibs (viceroy), relatives, as well as a member of the close circle of Imam Shamil.

Early life 
He was born to Sultan Ahmad Khan of Elisu and his second wife Tuti Bike, daughter of Surkhay II of Gazikumukh . He had 4 elder brothers - Imran beg, Muhammad beg, Khalil beg and Musa beg. He also had younger half-brother called Amir Hamza.

Succession crisis ensued afterwards, with Russian authorities not preferring the eldest son Imran bek, whose mother Shamay was his father's third cousin as well. According to Russian intelligence reports, Imran beg was deemed as weak-willed would be prone to be under influence of his younger brother Muhammad beg. Moreover, his wife was a daughter of Khalid beg, a son of Surkhay II, sworn enemy of Russian Empire.

Second and third sons of deceased sultan were born from Pari Jahan Khanum, a daughter of Bala Agha beg, a close associate of Abbas Mirza  who was arrested by Yermolov as a rebel and kept in Metekhi prison. Thus, they were dismissed from succession too.

Musa was more favourable, since his mother was a sister of Aslan Khan of Kura Khanate, a major Russian ally. In addition to that, Musa was also married to a daughter of Murtuzali (d. 1815), another son of Surkhay II, as well as half-brother of Aslan, who was killed by his father. As a compensation, Imran bey was granted the village of Meshebashi and Muhammad bey received Aghatai.

Reign 
His full-brother Musa's reign lasted only 8 months and was succeeded by Daniyal. Paskevich approved Daniyal with the rank of sultan on February 14, 1831 with the rank of captain in Russian Imperial Army. Daniyal soon managed to stabilize the situation both inside and outside the sultanate in a short time. Gradually, he gained significant prestige and influence in northwestern Azerbaijan and neighboring Dagestan.

However, his succession wasn't as smooth as he expected. His elder half-brother Muhammad beg assaulted Daniyal with a dagger in December 1832 in the village of Baylar, but was stopped by the blow of the latter's nuker. Another half-brother, Khalil, was robbed and killed by unknown assailants at the entrance to village of Tangyt together with his own nukers. While their mother accused Daniyal of murder, official investigator general-major Nikolai Antropov found no evidence of Daniyal's guilt.

Same year Daniyal was granted the rank major by Russian authorities for resisting Hamzat bek's invasion of Jar. He was awarded Order of Saint Stanislaus of 3rd degree for his accomplishments against Caucasian Imamate. He rose to be lieutenant-colonel in 1838. He was escorting Jamaluddin, son of Shamil who was given as hostage to Russians in 1839 after Siege of Akhoulgo. According to Lesley Blanch, he advised Jamaluddin to be brave, strong and courageous and to trust his new friends in Avar language. Same year, he annexed Rutul Federation to his lands.

He received the right to wear the uniform of the Life Guards of the Grodno Hussars and was promoted to colonel in 1840. However as the sultan, he was subordinate to the administrator of the Djaro-Belokan region, which in 1840 was included in the Georgia-Imeretia Governorate as the Belokan district. The district was subdivided into three sections: Belokansky, Yeniselsky and Elisuysky, the last of which consisted of all the lands of the sultanate under the direct control of the sultan. Two years later, the sultan was subordinate to the military district chief of the newly formed Djaro-Belokansky district, General Schwarz, who began to restrict the rights of the sultan. For his part, Daniyal did not want to go into direct relations with Schwarz, instead directly appealed to Nicholas I in 1842 to be accepted as vassal ruler of his domains, rather than a subordinate to a Russian governor with the same dignity as Principality of Mingrelia.

Still hopeful of to be granted princely dignity, he fought on the Russian side with his militia in the war between the followers of Shamil and Russian troops in Gazikumukh from March 1842 to May.

Under Shamil 
General Schwarz's continuation of curbing his power finally led Russian authorities to accuse Daniyal of swearing allegiance to his old foe Imam Shamil on 16 June 1844 and summoned him to Zaqatala, wanting arrest. Daniyal didn't show up, which gave Schwarz a reason to march on Elisu. Daniyal was defeated near Aghatai with his 3,000 army on 3 July and his capital was soon captured after siege. The sultan managed to escape to the mountains, after which he became Shamil's naib in the Avar village of Irib (in modern Charodinsky district). Elisu was destroyed, while only the city mosque remaining behind. On August 8, the Russians annexed the sultanate to the Zagatala Okrug. According to Karl Heinrich Koch, up to this point, he was the most sincere Russian vassal, protected the country against the raids of Tushetians and Lezgis faithfully. Although he tried to negotiate with Mikhail Semyonovich Vorontsov in April 1845 for return to Russian citizenship, not being able to regain his sultanate, he walked off from the deal.

Daniyal lead the Imamate army in 1847 to Zaktal Okrug and recaptured Elisu on 16 May. Caught offguard, Russians were unable to fight the guerilla warfare in Balaken. Rumours of Haji Murad's arrival to help Danyal further alerted Schwarz who demanded reinforcements. Danyal soon retreated to mountains on 21 June. After the fall of the Gergebil fortress, Shamil began a campaign in the upper reaches of the Samur River on September 17, 1848. On the same day, Daniyal suddenly attacked Kala. On September 25, he besieged the village of Akhty, which was the seat of the head of the Samur district of the Dagestan region of the Russian Empire. Neighboring Tiffliskoe barracks fell on September 26, and highlanders killed the entire garrison. In early October, Daniyal, Kebet Muhammad and Hadji Murad settled down at Miskindzha with 7,000 fighters in order to prevent Argutinsky from coming to the aid of the defenders of the Akhty, who were still holding out. But the Russians managed to break through and approach the fortress, after which Shamil retreated into the mountains.

Russians launched an offensive against Tabasaran in July 1849. In order to distract them, Daniyal made a distractionary attack on Kumukh. However, this maneuver, like others undertaken by Shamil, did not distract Russians led by Moisey Argutinsky from entering Tabasaran. Daniyal joined Shamil's delegation in March 1853 to be sent to Istanbul in order to convince the Ottoman Empire to start the Crimean War as early as possible. Daniyal Bey battled Russian forces on September 12 after Sheikh Shamil's failure in the siege of Zakatala fortress on September 9 and withdrew as defeated. Danyal captured Zakatala in October, of the 5,000 Russian soldiers present there, 3,000 were wounded or died, and the rest escaped, realizing that they could not resist after fighting for 36 hours. Subsequently, when Daniyal turned towards Shirvan and captured Signakh and Sheki in this region, General Grigol Orbeliani asked some of the Russian soldiers in Crimea, Abkhazia and Anapa to reinforce the Tbilisi front.

In April 1859, the Russian troops captured the capital of Shamil - the village of Vedeno, after which the last pockets of resistance on the territory of Chechnya were suppressed. Imam Shamil with his supporters went to the Dagestan village of Gunib. While Daniyal surrendered his residence Irib and the village of Dusrek to Baron Alexander Wrangel on August 2, and on August 7 he went with a confession to Prince Aleksandr Baryatinsky, who granted him full amnesty.

Last years 
After Shamil's defeat, he acted as a mediator between two sides to obtain Shamil's full submission. He lived in Tbilisi for a while. Daniyal, with his former rank of major general was returned with enrollment in the army cavalry and in the Caucasian army on September 25, 1861. He arrived in Constantinople in June and visited Sultan Abdulaziz. He died in Istanbul on 23 May 1871 and buried in Karacaahmet Cemetery. 12 books belonging to him is currently kept in Princeton University Library.

Family 
He had at least three wives with numerous offsprings:

 Baba Bike, daughter of Ahmad III of Mehtuli Khanate
 Musa bey (b. 1843) — married to Ummu Khanum (b. 1849), daughter of Aghakishi beg Khodjanov
 Mahmud agha (b. 1866)
 Bike (b. 1868)
 Nene Khanum — married to Abdurrahman bey (grandson of Tahir bey, brother of Aslan Khan of Kura), later married to Muhammad bey, son of colonel Haji Agha bey
 Murtuzali Khan (b. 1855)
 Ummu Gulsum (b. 1858)
 Begüm Bike (b. 1839) — married to Makhay bey (b. 1839), son of Yusuf bey (himself a descendant of Elisu sultans)
 Humay Sultan (b. 1856)
 Yusuf bey (b. 1860)
 Omar bey (b. 1864)
 Abbas bey (b. 1866)
 Kerimat Bike (d. 1862, Nukha) — m. 1851 to Gazi Muhammad, son of Imam Shamil
 Ummu Bike (died in infancy)
 Juvai Rade (b. 1844)
 Bala Khanum — daughter of Haji Abdulqadir Khan of Shaki

References

Sources 

 

1871 deaths
1809 births
Burials at Karacaahmet Cemetery
Recipients of the Order of St. Vladimir, 3rd class
Recipients of the Order of St. Anna, 2nd class
Recipients of the Order of Saint Stanislaus (Russian), 3rd class
Imperial Russian major generals
People of the Caucasian War